Maurice Thomas "Mike" Gavagan (April 10, 1900 – January 9, 1957) was an American football player.  

Gavagan was born in 1900 in Warsaw, New York. He played college football for St. Bonaventure and later played professional football a fullback for the Rochester Jeffersons in the National Football League (NFL). He appeared in two NFL games, both as a starter, during the 1923 season. 

After retiring from football, Gavagan worked as a construction engineer.  He served with the U.S. Navy Seabees in the Pacific theater during World War II. He died in 1957 at Wyoming County Community Hospital in Warsaw, New York.

References

1900 births
1957 deaths
Rochester Jeffersons players
People from Kaufman County, Texas
Players of American football from Texas